Stadion an der Hafenstraße, known as Stadion Essen until 2022, is a stadium in Essen, Germany. Located in the borough of Bergeborbeck, it has a capacity of 20,650 spectators. It is the home of Rot-Weiss Essen in the third-level men's 3. Liga and SGS Essen in the women's Frauen-Bundesliga and replaced Georg-Melches-Stadion.

History
The stadium was officially opened on August 12, 2012, with a match between the under-19s of Rot-Weiss Essen and Borussia Dortmund (3-2). Afterwards the women's club SGS Essen played against 1. FFC Frankfurt. During the latter match, the Frankfurt players were replaced after 80 minutes by eleven male players from Rot-Weiss Essen.

The last stand was finished shortly before the start of the 2013/14 season. For this occasion, an opening match between Rot-Weiss Essen and Werder Bremen (0-2) was held on August 8 in front of 11,513 spectators.

The stadium was sold out for the first time on April 8, 2014, for the semi-final match of the Lower Rhine Cup between Rot-Weiss Essen and MSV Duisburg.

In November 2021, Rot-Weiss Essen purchased the rights to the stadium name. The stadium was renamed Stadion an der Hafenstraße in January 2022; the Georg-Melches-Stadion it replaced carried the same name from 1939 to 1964.

References

Football venues in Germany
Sports venues completed in 2012
Stadion Essen
Stadion Essen
Sports venues in North Rhine-Westphalia
SGS Essen